Kind of Light, released in 2003 is the debut album from Los Angeles, California pop/rock band The 88.  The album includes the songs "How Good It Can Be" and "Hard to Be You" which have featured on The O.C.

Track listing
All songs written by Keith Slettedahl.
 "All the Same" – 2:12
 "Afterlife" – 3:23
 "Elbow Blues" – 3:42
 "How Good It Can Be" – 3:53
 "Kind of Light" – 3:59
 "No Use Left for Me" – 3:42
 "God Is Coming" – 3:45
 "Hate Me" – 5:02
 "I'm a Man" – 4:01
 "Melting in the Sun" – 3:48
 "Sunday Afternoon" – 3:21
 "Something Had Me Good" – 2:52
 "Hard to Be You" – 2:30

Enhanced version

The 88 have released an enhanced version of Kind of Light which features new artwork and 2 bonus music videos.

References

The 88 albums
2003 debut albums